Aglossa brabanti is a species of snout moth in the genus Aglossa. It was described by Ragonot in 1884, and is known from France and the Iberian Peninsula.

The wingspan is about 20 mm.

References

Moths described in 1884
Pyralini
Moths of Europe